1921 was the 28th season of County Championship cricket in England. Australia emphasised a post-war superiority that it owed in particular to the pace duo of Gregory and McDonald. Having won 5–0 in Australia the previous winter, the Australians won the first three Tests of the 1921 tour and then drew the last two to retain the Ashes. It was the 29th test series between the two sides.

The County Championship was won for the second year in succession by Middlesex County Cricket Club. Glamorgan County Cricket Club joined the championship for the first time.

Honours
County Championship - Middlesex
Minor Counties Championship - Staffordshire
Wisden - Hubert Ashton, Jack Bryan, Jack Gregory, Charlie Macartney, Ted McDonald

Test series

County Championship

Leading batsmen
Phil Mead topped the averages with 3179 runs @ 69.10

Leading bowlers
Wilfred Rhodes topped the averages with 141 wickets @ 13.27

Annual reviews
 Wisden Cricketers' Almanack 1922

Further reading
 Bill Frindall, The Wisden Book of Test Cricket 1877-1978, Wisden, 1979
 Chris Harte, A History of Australian Cricket, Andre Deutsch, 1993
 Ray Robinson, On Top Down Under, Cassell, 1975

External links
 CricketArchive – season summary

References

1921 in English cricket
English cricket seasons in the 20th century
Welsh cricket in the 20th century